Industrial schools is a type of school that teach vocational training, domestic training, and manual labour. The list includes active and defunct schools.

Canada
Battleford Industrial School in Battleford, Northwest Territories (now Saskatchewan)
Kuper Island Indian Industrial School in Kuper Island, British Columbia
Qu'Appelle Industrial School in Qu'Appelle Valley, Saskatchewan
Victoria Industrial School for Boys (now the Mimico Correctional Centre) in Mimico, Ontario

England
East London Industrial School in London
St George's Roman Catholic Boys Industrial School in Everton
Meath Protestant Industrial School for Boys in Blackrock

Ireland

New Zealand
Burnham Industrial School
Stoke Industrial School in Stoke, Nelson

United States

Alabama 
 Alabama Industrial School for Negro Children in Montgomery, Alabama
 Alabama Girls’ Industrial School (now University of Montevallo) in Montevallo, Alabama
 Montgomery Industrial School for Girls in Montgomery, Alabama
 Kowaliga Academic and Industrial Institute in Kowaliga, Alabama

Arkansas 

 Arkansas Negro Boys' Industrial School in Jefferson County, Arkansas

California 
 Cogswell Technical School, San Francisco, California
 San Francisco Industrial School in San Francisco, California

Florida 
Daytona Normal and Industrial School in Daytona Beach, Florida
Florida Industrial School for Boys in Marianna, Florida

Georgia 
 Haines Normal and Industrial School in Augusta, Georgia
 Fort Valley High and Industrial School in Fort Valley, Georgia
 Secondary Industrial School in Columbus, Georgia
 Thomas Jefferson Elder High and Industrial School in Sandersville, Georgia

Illinois 
 Illinois Industrial School for Girls in Park Ridge, Illinois

Iowa 
 Iowa Industrial School for Girls in Mitchellville, Iowa

Louisiana 
 Colored Industrial and Agricultural School in Grambling, Louisiana

Massachusetts 
 Hebrew Industrial School for Girls in Boston, Massachusetts

Michigan 
 Big Rapids Industrial School in Big Rapids, Michigan
 Mount Pleasant Indian Industrial Boarding School in Mt. Pleasant, Michigan

Minnesota 
 Morris Industrial School for Indians in Morris, Minnesota

Ohio 
 Cleveland Industrial School in Cleveland, Ohio
 Sallie McCall Industrial School in Cincinnati, Ohio

Pennsylvania 
 Carlisle Indian Industrial School in Carlisle, Pennsylvania
 Downingtown Industrial and Agricultural School in Chester County, Pennsylvania
 St. Francis Industrial School in Eddington, Pennsylvania
 Thaddeus Stevens Industrial School of Lancaster in Lancaster, Pennsylvania

New York 
 Howard Orphanage and Industrial Institute (also known as Howard Colored Orphan Asylum), New York City, New York
 School of Industrial Art, New York City, New York

North Carolina 
 Slater State Normal and Industrial School in Winston-Salem, North Carolina
 State Normal and Industrial College (now University of North Carolina at Greensboro) in Greensboro, North Carolina

South Carolina 
 Denmark Industrial School in Denmark, South Carolina

South Dakota 
 Northern Normal and Industrial School, Northern State University in Aberdeen, South Dakota

Vermont 
 Vermont Industrial School in Vergennes, Vermont

Virginia 
 Hampton Agricultural and Industrial School in Hampton, Virginia
 Virginia Home and Industrial School for Girls in Bon Air, Virginia
 State Normal and Industrial School for Women in Harrisonburg, Virginia
Saint Paul Normal and Industrial School in Lawrenceville, Virginia
State Normal and Industrial School for Women in Harrisonburg, Virginia

West Virginia 
 Lakin Industrial School in Lakin, West Virginia

Wisconsin 
 Wisconsin Industrial School for Girls in Milwaukee, Wisconsin

See also
Industrial Schools Act in England
Vocational education
Manual labor college
Reform school
Training school (United States)

References 

Industrial schools
Lists of schools
Vocational schools